Starlin may refer to:
Jim Starlin (born 1949), an American comic book writer and artist
Starlin Castro (born 1990), a professional Major League baseball player